Ángel Jiménez Cabeza is a Paralympic athlete from Cuba competing mainly in category F13 long jump events.

Jiménez is a double gold medalist winning the long jump in both the 2004 Summer Paralympics in Athens and the 2012 Summer Paralympics in London. He also won a silver medal in the 4 × 100 m relay team (T11-T13).

References

Paralympic athletes of Cuba
Cuban male long jumpers
Cuban male sprinters
Athletes (track and field) at the 2004 Summer Paralympics
Athletes (track and field) at the 2012 Summer Paralympics
Paralympic gold medalists for Cuba
Paralympic silver medalists for Cuba
Living people
Medalists at the 2004 Summer Paralympics
Medalists at the 2012 Summer Paralympics
Year of birth missing (living people)
Paralympic medalists in athletics (track and field)
Medalists at the 2011 Parapan American Games
Medalists at the 2015 Parapan American Games
Medalists at the World Para Athletics Championships
21st-century Cuban people